Capital punishment in Andorra was abolished in 1990, having last been used in 1943.

Pere Areny was the last man to be executed in Andorra. Originally sentenced to be executed by garrote, he was instead shot by a firing squad for the murder of his brother, Antoni Areny, on 18 October 1943. Capital punishment was abolished in Andorra in 1990 and Protocol No. 6 to the ECHR came into force on 1 February 1996.

References

 https://web.archive.org/web/20050324105012/http://www.geocities.com/richard.clark32%40btinternet.com/europe.html

Law of Andorra
Andorr
Human rights in Andorra
1990 disestablishments in Andorra
Death in Andorra